Shahrbanou Amani is a former MP of the Fifth and Sixth Parliament of Iran and a reformist. She was arrested on February 13, 2011, according to the Green Path Movement Site. During the previous Presidential election, Amani had harshly criticized the censorship imposed on media. Also according to this same site, Amani had allegedly signed letters requesting permits for demonstrations following the disputed presidential elections.

Both during and after her time in Parliament, Amani was a staunch supporter of women’s rights. She had criticized the "Family Support Bill," which sought to ease restrictions on the practice of polygamy by men. She was an MP representing the people of Urumieh, and prior to her arrest she worked at the State Welfare Organization. Amani was also an advocate and supporter of the One Million Signatures Campaign and its aims.

References

Year of birth missing (living people)
Living people